She Even Woke Me Up to Say Goodbye is the 13th album by pianist and singer Jerry Lee Lewis. It was released on Mercury Records in 1970.

Background
She Even Woke Me Up to Say Goodbye was Lewis's sixth album for Mercury since his 1968 comeback album Another Place, Another Time. Lewis was also in competition with himself, as Shelby Singleton, who had bought the entire Sun Records catalog from Sam Phillips on July 1, 1969, began releasing albums featuring unheard recordings by Lewis, many of them country songs, to capitalize on Jerry Lee's revitalized commercial appeal. As country music historian Colin Escott recounts in his essay for the 1986 Bear Family retrospective The Killer: The Smash/Mercury Years, "Singleton continued to release titles from the old Sun catalog (sometimes with new overdubs) as though they were current product, usually timing the releases so that they appeared just as Jerry's new smash single had peaked...Singleton began programming albums with vague themes, using contemporary photos wherever possible to create the illusion that these might be new recordings."  Consequently, the market was flooded with product, turning Lewis into one of the most in-demand country artists in the business.

Recording and composition
By the dawn of the new decade, Lewis had scored five straight Top 5 country hits for Smash in less than two years (including the chart topper "To Make Love Sweeter For You"), and his streak continued with "She Even Woke Me Up To Say Goodbye," which made it all the way to number 2. The song had been co-written by Mickey Newbury, who would become best known for his arrangement of "An American Trilogy," later made famous by Elvis Presley, but it was Lewis who had been the first major artist to cover one of Newbury's compositions, having recorded "Just Dropped In (To See What Condition My Condition Was In)" for his 1967 album Soul My Way. Lewis's vocal on "She Even Woke Me Up To Say Goodbye" has been widely praised, with biographer Rick Bragg opining in Jerry Lee Lewis: His Own Story, "Some songs make people think they were written for them. This is the opposite: in this song, it's as if Jerry  were living inside the lyrics."  In the book Jerry Lee Lewis: Lost and Found, producer Jerry Kennedy  marvelled to Joe Bonomo, "He learned 'She Even Woke Me Up To Say Goodbye' and did that cut of it after hearing the song one time. He really is a genius."  The album also features the top 5 hit "Once More with Feeling," which was written by Kris Kristofferson and Shel Silverstein. Bonomo quotes Kristofferson: "I consider Jerry Lee Lewis one of the great singers of all time. Put him up there with opera singers. He had a way of transforming my songs into something I couldn't believe I was hearing."

The album continues with the winning formula  established on Lewis's recent country albums like Another Place, Another Time and She Still Comes Around (To Love What's Left Of Me), pairing Jerry Lee's unmistakable piano playing and soulful vocals with top shelf Nashville musicians on a mixed bag of honky-tonk drinking songs and sad ballads. As on those two previous albums, Lewis covers a Merle Haggard song, this time the blue collar anthem "Workin' Man Blues" ("Down in Lou'siana," he adlibs during the instrumental break, "we call that boogie woogie!") and  pays tribute to one of his musical heroes, Jimmie Rodgers, on the song "Waiting for a Train."  However, Lewis's rock and roll roots also began showing through on several cuts, with AllMusic noting: "He had been riding high on his new hits - so successful that new collections of his Sun singles made it to the country Top Ten - and took that as encouragement to do whatever he damn well pleased on this new record. So, he cut pure rock & roll (a thundering cover of "Brown Eyed Handsome Man"), inserted his name in every other song (in every verse on "Since I Met You Baby," where he manages to find a place to say his full name), laughed and leered, growled and crooned, pounding and gliding down the keyboard in equal measure."

According to the liner notes for the 2006 collection A Half Century of Hits, Kennedy didn’t dare release an uptempo single because he couldn't risk radio programmers declaring that Lewis was returning to his rockabilly past, so up-tempo songs like "Workin’ Man Blues" were consigned to LPs. Although Kennedy liked to record in closed sessions, he eventually came to appreciate that Lewis needed an audience: “Bad as I hated it, he did better with a crowd. I can remember 70 or 80 people in the control room and standing around the studio. One time we almost had a song nailed and there was a thunk right at the end. Some guy had left the studio and slammed the door. The engineer went down and was chewing him out. 'Why’d you do that?' The guy said, 'The ice in Jerry’s drink was melting.'"  The ease with which Lewis conveyed these often bitterly sad country songs came as no surprise to him, as he explained in the 1990 documentary The Jerry Lee Lewis Story: "I am a rock and roll artist and I can cover the other country-type territory if I have to sneak in the back door...If you wanna be an ass-dragging hillbilly singer, you can be one if you really want to."

Reception
She Even Woke Me Up To Say Goodbye was released in January 1970 and rose to number 9 on the Billboard country album charts. Stephen Thomas Erlewine of AllMusic calls the album "the fieriest, loosest performances he's given since leaving Sun (not counting, of course, the then-unreleased Star Club live recording), which jolts the hardcore country of Another Place and She Still Comes Around to a different stratosphere. Those were spectacular pure country records by any measure, but this is a spectacular pure Jerry Lee country record, where he's the center of every cut, every performance, and the record is tremendously addictive for it."  In 2009, Lewis biographer Joe Bonomo echoed these sentiments, writing that "Jerry Lee's last pure country record is the apex of his resurgence...Even Another Place, Another Time and She Still Comes Around (To Love What's Left Of Me) fall short of the kind of devotions to the rich traditions and history of honky-tonk music that this album reveals."

Track listing

Personnel
Jerry Lee Lewis - vocals, piano
Bob Moore - bass
Buddy Harman - drums
Kenny Lovelace - fiddle
Ray Edenton, Jerry Kennedy, Jerry Shook, Chip Young - guitar
Hargus "Pig" Robbins - organ
Ned Davis - steel guitar

1970 albums
Jerry Lee Lewis albums
Albums produced by Jerry Kennedy
Mercury Records albums